This article lists the rulers of Shewa, a historical region of Ethiopia. Claiming Solomonic descent, Negasi Krestos established Shewa as an autonomous region of the weakening Ethiopian Empire in the 17th century before requesting the title of Meridazmatch, which would be adopted by his successors, and beginning a southern expansion of his realm that would culminate in his descendant Menelik's Expansions.

List of the rulers of Shewa
All rulers were members of the Solomonic dynasty.

See also
Zemene Mesafint

External links
World Statesmen – Ethiopia (Shewa/Shoa)
Rulers.org – Ethiopia (Shewa)

Ethiopia history-related lists
 
Lists of African rulers